Saint Beatus of Liébana (730 – c. 800) was a monk, theologian, and geographer from the former Duchy of Cantabria and Kingdom of Asturias, in modern Cantabria, northern Spain, who worked and lived in the Picos de Europa mountains of the region of Liébana. He is best remembered today as the author of the Commentary on the Apocalypse.

Biography
Beatus was likely born and raised in Liébana, possibly from a poor family. As confessor to Queen Adosinda, wife of Silo of Asturias, and as teacher of Alcuin of York and Etherius of Osma, Beatus exercised wide influence.

He is best remembered today as the author of the Commentary on the Apocalypse, written in 776, then revised in 784 and again in 786. The Commentary was popular during the Middle Ages and survives in at least 34 manuscripts (usually called a beatus) from the 10th through the 16th centuries. Not all of the manuscripts are complete, and some exist only in fragmentary form. Twenty-six of these manuscripts are lavishly decorated in the Mozarabic, Romanesque, or Gothic style of illumination.

Beatus was a strong opponent of the Adoptionist Christology put forward by Elipandus, Bishop of Toledo and founder of the Adoptivi, and Bishop Felix of Urgell in the Iberian Peninsula. Elipandus and Felix declared that Jesus, in respect to his human nature, was the adopted son of God by God's grace, thus emphasizing the distinction between the divinity and the humanity of Christ. Beatus and other opponents of adoptionism, such as Alcuin and Paulinus II of Aquileia, feared that this view would so divide the person of the Savior that the reality of the incarnation would be lost. In addition, many theologians were concerned that this adoptionism was a new version of the Nestorianism advanced by Nestorius. This debate largely died with the deaths of the proponents.

Author and theologian

The Commentary on the Apocalypse is a work of erudition but without great originality, made up principally of compilations. Beatus includes long extracts from the texts of the Fathers of the Church and Doctors of the Church, especially Augustine of Hippo, Ambrose, Ticonius, Irenaeus, and Isidore of Seville. He adds to this the commentary on the Book of Daniel by Jerome.

The Beatus text was regarded as a symbol of Christian resistance to the Muslims who dominated much of the Iberian Peninsula (see al-Andalus) in the early Middle Ages.

See also
Catholic Church in Spain

References

Further reading 

For more information on Beatus of Liébana or on the Beatus Apocalypse manuscripts, see the studies carried out by John Williams, Mireille Mentre, José Camón Aznar, Wilhelm Neuss and Joaquín Yarza Luaces.

 
Cancionero de Liébana 1977 ("Collection of verse of Liebana", 1977). Republished in 2006. Written by the Spanish poet from Cantabria Matilde Camus.
 Brigitte Englisch: Ordo orbis terrae. Die Weltsicht in den Mappae mundi des frühen und hohen Mittelalters. Berlin 2002, S. 171 ff.
 Forbes, Andrew; Henley, David (2012). Apocalypse: The Illustrated Book of Revelation. Chiang Mai: Cognoscenti Books. ASIN: B008WAK9SS

External links
 CatholicSaints
 Catholic Online

730 births
800 deaths
8th-century apocalypticists
8th-century Christian saints
8th-century Christian theologians
8th-century Asturian people
Book of Revelation
Clergy from Cantabria
Cantabrian culture
Medieval Spanish saints
Medieval Spanish theologians
Spanish Christian theologians